The BACHO record format is one of the two standard formats used for the interchange of financial transactions in the New Zealand banking system.  The other standard format is QC.

BACHO-format transactions are primarily used in batch processing systems running on MVS mainframe computers.

A BACHO record is a fixed-length 160-byte entity.  This length restriction has led to a number of complexities in interpreting the contents of BACHO transactions, including:
 Some BACHO fields are interpreted differently depending on whether they contain numeric or alphabetic data.
 Some BACHO transactions are broken into multiple records, and then reassembled for processing.

The BACHO file consists of lines of data that contain individual records, one per line. The format of the BACHO file is as follows:
1. A Header record
2. Multiple lines of data for each transaction
3. A summary line showing transaction totals for each bank or institution
4. A summary line showing total transactions for the BACHO file

There are several formats. Most banks or trading houses use their own format, and the purpose for the BACHO file can change also, depending on what is being reported. For instance, the information may be payroll data, which will be laid out differently to EFTPOS transactional data.

See also

 Record-oriented filesystem

Payment interchange standards
Banking in New Zealand